Dominic Thiem was the defending champion, but chose to compete in Kitzbühel instead.

Fabio Fognini won the title, defeating Andrej Martin in the final, 6–4, 6–1.

Seeds
The top four seeds receive a bye into the second round.

Draw

Finals

Top half

Bottom half

Qualifying

Seeds
The top two seeds received a bye into the qualifying competition.

Qualifiers

Qualifying draw

First qualifier

Second qualifier

Third qualifier

Fourth qualifier

References
 Main Draw
 Qualifying Draw

Croatia Open Umag - Singles
2016 Singles
2016 in Croatian tennis